Joe Walker (born March 19, 1977) is a former American football safety. He played college football at Nebraska. He played for the Tennessee Titans in 2001 and for the Indianapolis Colts in 2002.

A dangerous return man and two-year starter in the Husker secondary, Joe Walker owns the school record for most kickoff returns with 53 and ranks second all-time at Nebraska with 1,159 kickoff return yards, finishing 284 yards behind school record holder Tyrone Hughes (1,443 from 1989-1992).  He tied the Nebraska record for most career interception returns for TDs with three (one each in 1997, 1998, and 2000), and tied an NCAA record for scoring on a kickoff, punt and interception return in the same season (1998).  Walker also ranks eighth all-time at Nebraska  with 653 punt return yards, giving him 1,972 return yards and five return TDs.  Walker posted 132 career tackles, 14 tackles for loss, 12 career pass breakups and seven interceptions.  Playing in 45 games, missing just three, Walker had 18 career starts, including 10 in 2000.  As a senior, he recorded a career-high 44 tackles and broke up nine passes

References

1977 births
Living people
American football defensive backs
Nebraska Cornhuskers football players
Tennessee Titans players
Indianapolis Colts players